CMA CGM Thalassa is a container ship owned by Global Ship Lease and on long-term charter to the shipping line CMA CGM. The ship was delivered to the ship operator on 30 December 2008. The vessel was built by Daewoo Shipbuilding & Marine Engineering in South Korea.

Design 
The ship has a capacity of 10,960 TEU.

Engine 
The main engine of CMA CGM Thalassa is a MAN Diesel 12K98ME-C, which produces 72,264 kW enabling the vessel to reach a maximum speed of 24.7 knots. The cruising speed of the container ship is 24.3 knots.

References 

Container ships
Thalassa
2008 ships